Ayad is both an Arabic given name and a surname. Notable people with the name include:

Given name:
Ayad Alkadhi (born 1971), Iraqi artist
Ayad Allawi (born 1945), Iraqi politician
Ayad Lamdassem (born 1981), Spanish long-distance runner
Ayad Rahim (born 1962), Iraqi-American journalist
Ayad al-Samarrai, Iraqi politician
Ayad Al Adhamy,  Musician and Record Producer

Surname:
Ahmad Ayad (born 1991), Iraqi footballer
Mohammed Ali Ayad (born 1978), Qatari judoka

See also
Həyat

Arabic-language surnames
Arabic masculine given names